The 1986–87 Hartford Whalers season saw the Whalers finish in first place in the Adams Division with a record of 43 wins, 30 losses, and 7 ties for 93 points. They lost the Adams Division semi-finals in six games to the Quebec Nordiques. This was the only time in franchise history that the Whalers finished above fourth place in their division before their relocation to North Carolina.

Offseason
At the 1986 NHL Entry Draft held at the Montreal Forum on June 21, the Whalers selected Scott Young from Boston University of Hockey East. In 38 games with Boston University, Young scored 16 goals and 29 points during the 1985-86 season.

On July 10, Hartford signed free agent Dallas Gaume, who had played with the University of Denver of the WCHA for the past four seasons. Gaume scored 37 goals and 99 points in 47 games during the 1985-86 season, as he was named to the All-WCHA First Team.

On October 3, the Whalers signed free agent Greg Britz, who was previously in the Toronto Maple Leafs organization. During the 1985-86 season, Britz scored 17 goals and 36 points in 72 games with the St. Catharines Saints of the AHL. Britz had appeared in seven NHL games with Toronto between 1983–85, earning no points.

At the NHL Waiver Draft on October 6, the Whalers selected Gord Sherven from the Edmonton Oilers. Sherven split the 1985-86 season between the Oilers and the Minnesota North Stars, as he scored a goal and four points in 18 games. In 49 AHL games split between the Springfield Indians and Nova Scotia Oilers, Sherven scored 17 goals and 41 points.

The Whalers and Calgary Flames were involved in a trade on October 7, as the Whalers acquired Yves Courteau from the Flames in exchange for Mark Paterson. In four games with Calgary during the 1985-86 season, Courteau scored a goal and two points. He spent most of the season with the Flames AHL affiliate, the Moncton Golden Flames, as he scored 19 goals and 40 points in 59 games.

NHL Draft

Regular season

Season standings

Schedule and results
THIS IS AN INCOMPLETE LIST

|-
| 1986-87 Schedule

Green background indicates win.
Red background indicates regulation loss.
White background indicates overtime/shootout loss.

Playoffs

Nordiques 4, Whalers 2
The Whalers opened the 1987 Stanley Cup Playoffs against the Quebec Nordiques in a best-of-seven series. Quebec finished the regular season with a 31-39-10 record, earning 72 points, which was 21 fewer points than the Whalers, and the fourth and final playoff position in the Adams Division. The Whalers and Nordiques faced off against each other in the 1986 Stanley Cup Playoffs, as the fourth place Whalers swept the first place Nordiques in the first round.

The series opened on April 8 at the Hartford Civic Center. Quebec scored the lone goal of the first period, as Peter Stastny beat Whalers goaltender Mike Liut as Quebec took a 1-0 lead. The Nordiques extended their lead to 2-0 after a goal by Robert Picard at 6:32, however, just under three minutes later, the Whalers John Anderson scored on the power play, cutting the Nordiques lead to 2-1 after two periods. In the third period, the Whalers Dean Evason scored 8:48 into the period, tying the game 2-2. The game would go into overtime, as neither team could score again. In the extra period, Hartford's Paul MacDermid scored 2:20 into the period, as the Whalers completed the comeback and defeated the Nordiques 3-2 to take a 1-0 series lead.

The series resumed the next evening in Hartford, however, it would be the Nordiques once again opening the scoring, as Randy Moller scored 3:35 into the game to give Quebec a 1-0 lead. The Whalers responded with a goal by Sylvain Turgeon, tying the game 1-1, however, the Nordiques Jeff Brown scored a power play goal late in the period, giving Quebec a 2-1 lead into the first intermission. The Whalers tied the game midway through the second period on a goal by Stew Gavin at 10:26 into the period, then a goal 89 seconds later by Scot Kleinendorst gave the Whalers their first lead of the game at 3-2. Late in the period, the Whalers Paul MacDermid beat Nordiques goaltender Clint Malarchuk, extending the Whalers lead to 4-2 after the second period. In the third period, Hartford's Dana Murzyn scored 6:58 into the period on the power play, as the Whalers took a 5-2 lead. The Nordiques fought back with goals by John Ogrodnick and Lane Lambert, however, Hartford hung on for the 5-4 victory and took a 2-0 series lead.

The third game of the series was played on April 11 at Le Colisée in Quebec City. Peter Stastny of the Nordiques opened the scoring with a shorthanded goal only 1:20 into the period, giving the Nordiques a 1-0 lead. Just over six minutes later, Stastny scored his second goal of the game, extending Quebec's lead to 2-0. The Nordiques scored again, as Michel Goulet scored on the power play, as Quebec took a 3-0 lead into the first intermission. The Nordiques continued their dominance in the second period, as Goulet scored his second of the game 3:34 into the period, giving Quebec a 4-0 lead, as Whalers goaltender Mike Liut was pulled from the game, being replaced by Steve Weeks. Just under three minutes later, the Nordiques scored again, as Peter Stastny scored his third goal of the game, as Quebec took a commanding 5-0 lead. The Whalers managed to shut Quebec down for the remainder of the game, however, they would only get an early third period goal by Ron Francis, as Quebec won game three by a score of 5-1, cutting the Whalers series lead to 2-1.

Game four of the series was played the next evening in Quebec. The Nordiques once again opened the scoring, as Jeff Brown put the puck past Mike Liut, giving Quebec a 1-0 lead at the 4:53 mark. The Whalers Dana Murzyn tied the game at 10:25 of the first period, however, the Nordiques responded with a late power play goal by Michel Goulet, as Quebec took a 2-1 lead after the first period. In the second period, the Nordiques Michel Goulet scored the lone goal, his second of the game, extending Quebec's lead to 3-1 after two periods. Goulet would record the hat trick with a power play goal at 9:44 in the third period, as Quebec defeated the Whalers 4-1 to even the series at two games each.

The fifth game of the series was back in Hartford on April 14. For the fifth time of the series, Quebec opened the scoring, as Robert Picard scored on the power play 7:17 into the first period. The Whalers tied it just under two and a half minutes later on a goal by Ron Francis, then Hartford took a 2-1 lead on a power play goal by Mike McEwen at 13:38 into the period. The Nordiques tied the game on a power play goal by Jeff Brown at the 15:10 mark of the period, however, the Whalers re-took the lead with a late period goal by Ray Ferraro, as Hartford had a 3-2 lead after the first period. In the second period, the Nordiques John Ogrodnick scored the lone goal, as he connected on the power play, tying the game 3-3. In the third period, the Whalers Ray Ferraro and Kevin Dineen each took a two minute penalty 2:27 into the third, giving Quebec a five-on-three advantage. The Nordiques took advantage, as John Ogrodnick and Michel Goulet each scored on the power play, giving the Nordiques a 5-3 lead. The Whalers fought back, as Dean Evason scored at 7:32, cutting the Nordiques lead to 5-4. Stew Gavin then tied the game with a goal at 11:19, making it 5-5. Hartford's comeback attempt was then stopped, as the Nordiques John Ogrodnick scored with 1:07 left in the game, giving Quebec a 6-5 lead. The Nordiques Mike Eagles then scored an empty net goal, as Quebec won the game 7-5, and took a 3-2 series lead.

Game six was back in Quebec, played on April 16, as the Whalers faced elimination. Hartford opened the scoring for the first time in the series, as Dean Evason scored a goal 1:06 into the game for the 1-0 lead. Quebec tied the game with a goal just over two minutes later by Lane Lambert. At 6:43, the Whalers took the lead once again, as Dave Babych scored on the power play, giving the Whalers a 2-1 lead. Kevin Dineen then added a goal at 13:32, as Hartford took a 3-1 lead after the first period. In the second period, Dineen scored his second goal of the game, 6:24 into the period on the power play, extending the Whalers lead to 4-1. Quebec's Peter Stastny replied with a power play goal of his own at 13:47, cutting the Whalers lead to 4-2. Just thirty seconds later, the Nordiques John Ogrodnick scored, as Hartford clung on to a 4-3 lead after two periods. In the third period, after a holding penalty to the Whalers Dave Babych, the Nordiques tied the game on a power play goal by Jason Lafreniere, making the score 4-4. Neither team could break the tie, as the game went into overtime. In the extra period, the Nordiques completed the comeback and the upset, as Peter Stastny scored his second goal of the game at 6:08 into the period, giving Quebec the 5-4 victory and winning the series 4-2, eliminating the Whalers from the post-season.

Quebec Nordiques 4, Hartford Whalers 2

Player statistics

Forwards
Note: GP = Games played; G = Goals; A = Assists; Pts = Points; PIM = Penalty minutes

Defencemen
Note: GP = Games played; G = Goals; A = Assists; Pts = Points; PIM = Penalty minutes

Goaltending
Note: GP = Games played; W = Wins; L = Losses; T = Ties; SO = Shutouts; GAA = Goals against average

Awards and honors
 Doug Jarvis, Bill Masterton Memorial Trophy

Transactions
The Whalers were involved in the following transactions during the 1986–87 season.

Trades

Waivers

Free agents

References

1986-87 Hartford Whalers at Hockey Reference

1986-87
1986–87 NHL season by team
1986–87 in American ice hockey by team
1986
Hartford
Hartford